Abdul Ghafoor Pechuho  better known by alias Humayooni (1261–1336), Also known as Muftoon Humayooni was an Islamic Scholar saint and poet, disciple, and student of his father Muhammad Yaqoob.
He belonged to Qadiri Sufi order, and started the mystic tradition known as Hanafi faqih, Islamic scholar, Maturidi theologian, and Sufi mystic originally from Kushan Empire in Greater Sindh. Much of what is known about his life is through Sufi tradition, and separating it from historical reality is difficult.
Hamaayooni's influence transcends national borders and ethnic divisions.

Hamaayooni's works

Humayooni wrote many books such as, Fatwaa-e-Humayooni, Deewane Maftoon, Frahang-e-Humayooni and others. Humayooni had command over Sindhi, Persian and Arabic, and taught these languages to his disciples. Besides that he was a poet and his book of poetry is known as Dewan-e-Maftoon.

Death 

He died on 11 Ramadan 1336 hijri 20 June 1918 C.E.

Urs Mubarak 
Disciples celebrate's Maftoon's Urs Mubarak every year in Islamic month Ramadan.

References

1261 births
1336 deaths
Indian Sufi saints
Sufi poets
Persian-language poets
17th-century Indian poets
18th-century Muslim scholars of Islam
Sufi shrines in Pakistan
Mystic poets